The Maryland House of Delegates is the lower house of the Maryland General Assembly, the state legislature of the U.S. State of Maryland. Three delegates are elected from each district, though some districts are divided into sub-districts. In the original state constitution, four delegates were elected from each county to one-year terms, and two were elected from each of the major early cities of Baltimore and Annapolis. Reforms in the 1830s, however, led to the apportionment of delegates by population rather than geography, and by 1922, delegates served four year terms. The modern system of apportionment of seats began in 1972, when 47 districts of roughly equal population were identified, although sub-districts were created to ensure local representation for areas with too little population to warrant an entire district.

Delegates are elected in even years when the President of the United States is not being elected, similar to most other state offices in Maryland. The most recent election was in November 2018. Delegates are not term-limited.

Party composition

Leadership

Membership

Notes

See also
 List of current members of the Maryland Senate

References

External links
 Maryland General Assembly

Maryland General Assembly
House of Delegates
Maryland